Marjanishvili is a station of the Tbilisi Metro on the Akhmeteli–Varketili Line (First Line). It was opened on 11 January 1966 as part of the original metro line with six stations from Didube to Rustaveli. The station is named after Kote Marjanishvili, a Georgian theater director.

External links
 Marjanishvili  station page at Tbilisi Municipal Portal

Tbilisi Metro stations
Railway stations opened in 1966
1966 establishments in Georgia (country)